The 2022–23 Syed Mushtaq Ali Trophy was the fifteenth season of the Syed Mushtaq Ali Trophy, a Twenty20 cricket tournament played in India. It was contested by 38 teams, divided into five groups, with eight teams in Group C. The tournament was announced by BCCI on 8 August 2022.

Karnataka won six of their seven matches, with Kerala winning five matches matches. Therefore, Karnataka advanced to the quarter-finals and Kerala progressed to the preliminary quarter-finals because of a higher net run rate than Haryana.

Points table

Fixutres
Source:

Round 1

Round 2

Round 3

Round 4

Round 5

Round 6

Round 7

References

2022 in Indian cricket
Domestic cricket competitions in 2022–23